The Nara River is a river located in Kutch in the Indian state of Gujarat. It flows northeast into the Great Rann of Kutch.

The Nara River originates near the Paneli village, in the southeastern parts of Lakhpat tehsil in the Kachchh district, and empties into the Great Rann of Kutch. The Nara Dam constructed across the river near the village of Nara now collects the entire discharge of the river in its reservoir.

References

External links 
Nara River marked on OpenStreetMap, retrieved 19 March 2021. 

Rivers of Gujarat
Rivers of India